Elections to Craigavon Borough Council were held on 20 May 1981 on the same day as the other Northern Irish local government elections. The election used four district electoral areas to elect a total of 25 councillors.

Election results

Note: "Votes" are the first preference votes.

Districts summary

|- class="unsortable" align="centre"
!rowspan=2 align="left"|Ward
! % 
!Cllrs
! % 
!Cllrs
! %
!Cllrs
! %
!Cllrs
! % 
!Cllrs
! %
!Cllrs
! %
!Cllrs
!rowspan=2|TotalCllrs
|- class="unsortable" align="center"
!colspan=2 bgcolor="" | UUP
!colspan=2 bgcolor="" | DUP
!colspan=2 bgcolor="" | SDLP
!colspan=2 bgcolor="" | RC
!colspan=2 bgcolor="" | Alliance
!colspan=2 bgcolor="" | UUUP
!colspan=2 bgcolor="white"| Others
|-
|align="left"|Area A
|14.8
|1
|12.4
|0
|bgcolor="#99FF66"|49.9
|bgcolor="#99FF66"|3
|19.8
|1
|0.0
|0
|0.0
|0
|3.1
|0
|5
|-
|align="left"|Area B
|bgcolor="40BFF5"|36.5
|bgcolor="40BFF5"|3
|30.7
|2
|16.5
|1
|6.7
|0
|9.5
|1
|0.0
|0
|0.0
|0
|7
|-
|align="left"|Area C
|bgcolor="40BFF5"|26.5
|bgcolor="40BFF5"|2
|22.0
|2
|19.0
|1
|14.2
|1
|6.3
|0
|0.0
|0
|12.0
|0
|6
|-
|align="left"|Area D
|bgcolor="40BFF5"|40.6
|bgcolor="40BFF5"|3
|38.6
|3
|6.9
|0
|0.0
|0
|0.0
|0
|13.8
|1
|0.0
|0
|7
|- class="unsortable" class="sortbottom" style="background:#C9C9C9"
|align="left"| Total
|30.8
|9
|27.1
|7
|20.8
|5
|9.4
|2
|4.1
|1
|3.9
|1
|3.9
|0
|25
|-
|}

Districts results

Area A

1977: 3 x SDLP, 1 x Republican Clubs, 1 x UUP
1981: 3 x SDLP, 1 x Republican Clubs, 1 x UUP
1977-1981 Change: No change

Area B

1977: 3 x UUP, 2 x Alliance, 1 x DUP, 1 x SDLP
1981: 3 x UUP, 2 x DUP, 1 x Alliance, 1 x SDLP
1977-1981 Change: DUP gain from Alliance

Area C

1977: 2 x UUP, 2 x SDLP, 1 x Alliance, 1 x DUP
1981: 2 x UUP, 2 x DUP, 1 x SDLP, 1 x Republican Clubs
1977-1981 Change: DUP and Republican Clubs gain from SDLP and Alliance

Area D

1977: 4 x UUP, 2 x DUP, 1 x UUUP
1981: 3 x UUP, 3 x DUP, 1 x UUUP
1977-1981 Change: DUP gain from UUP

References

Craigavon Borough Council elections
Craigavon